Neeuro Shaquille Jiménez Ortega (born 29 March 1996) is a Costa Rican footballer who currently plays for C.S. Uruguay de Coronado.

Career
Jiménez joined United Soccer League side Portland Timbers 2 on 1 March 2017.

In 2020, Shaquille joined C.S. Uruguay de Coronad.

References

External links
Timbers 2 Profile

1996 births
Living people
Association football defenders
Costa Rican footballers
Costa Rican expatriate footballers
Deportivo Saprissa players
Portland Timbers 2 players
Limón F.C. players
Costa Rican expatriate sportspeople in the United States
Expatriate soccer players in the United States
Liga FPD players
USL Championship players
People from Guanacaste Province